Keith Rayner  (June 20, 1943 – January 21, 2015) was a cognitive psychologist best known for pioneering modern eye-tracking methodology in reading and visual perception.

Career
Rayner obtained his B.S. and M.S. in Psychology at the University of Utah and subsequently obtained his Ph.D. from Cornell University with thesis titled The Perceptual Span and Peripheral Cues in Reading. In 1973, he was appointed as an Assistant Professor of Education, Psychology, and Visual Science at University of Rochester. From there, he moved to the University of Massachusetts Amherst in 1978. In 2008, Rayner moved to University of California, San Diego, where he held the position of Atkinson Family Professor of Psychology.
Rayner was the editor of the Journal of Experimental Psychology: Learning, Memory, and Cognition from 1990 to 1995 and editor of Psychological Review from 2004 to 2010.

Honors and awards
Rayner has received numerous awards for his achievements. In particular, he received the University of Massachusetts Amherst Chancellor’s Lifetime Achievement Award in 2006, the Bartlett Lecture Lifetime Achievement Award from the Experimental Psychology Society in 2007, an Alexander von Humboldt Foundation Research Award in 2009, and a UC San Diego Chancellor’s Associates Research Award in 2010. Rayner was named Carnegie Centenary Professor for 2011 by the Carnegie Trust for the Universities of Scotland.

Teaching
Rayner taught at the following universities:
University of Rochester (Assistant Professor of Education, Psychology, and Visual Science)
University of Massachusetts Amherst (Emeritus Distinguished Professor)
Oxford University (Visiting Professor)
Netherlands Institute for Advanced Study (Invited Visiting Fellow)
University of Durham (Honorary Professor)
Tianjin Normal University (Honorary Professor)
University of Southampton (Honorary Professor)
University of Potsdam (Visiting Humboldt Professor)
University of California, San Diego (Atkinson Family Professor of Psychology)

References

1943 births
2015 deaths
20th-century American psychologists
American cognitive psychologists
University of Utah alumni
Cornell University alumni